Miniland English High School, a privately owned institution with a history more than twenty years, is located in Thali, Daanchhi, Ward No 7 in the suburb of Kathmandu city. It offers education across levels of Kindergarten to School Leaving Certificate level.

Buildings 
The school has junior wing and senior wing. Junior students used to be taught in old building in Thali while senior students are taught in new building in SanoThali. After 2015 Nepal Earthquake the junior wing is also moved to the new building in Sano Thali.

Curriculum 
The Primary School consists of classes 1 to 5. In addition to oral work, activities, games, practicals, excursions etc., students are taught subjects like English, Nepali, Mathematics, Science, Social Studies, Computer Studies, Moral Science, General Knowledge and Health Education. Co-curricular activities such as singing, dance and instrumental music are taught.

The Lower Secondary School consists of classes 6 to 8. Besides English, Nepali, Mathematics, Science, Social Studies, Computer Studies, Moral Science, General Knowledge, the students are introduced to advanced level Mathematics and E. P. H. (Environment Health & Population) Co-curricular activities also includes Club activities.

The Secondary School consists of classes 9 and 10. The HMG (S. L. C.) curricular is followed in these classes. The students, however, take part in co-curricular activities and club activities. They are also introduced to a course in Advanced Level English.

Involvement
Miniland is actively involved in social work and human activities. Regular Scout training and field movement is done. There is the Rain Gauge station in Miniland which is installed in collaboration with CORAM Nepal an NGO working on Climate monitoring.

Schools in Nepal
1990 establishments in Nepal